The Pursat River (Steung Pursat) also known as Steung Tamyong is a major river of western Cambodia, It drains about two-thirds of the chain to the Tonlé Sap. Pursat and Tumpor lie along the river.

References

Rivers of Cambodia
Geography of Pursat province